UniNettuno University TV (formerly Rai Nettuno Sat 1) is an Italian educational television channel owned by Università telematica internazionale UniNettuno, a distance education organisation. In 2009, a second channel, Rai Nettuno Sat Due, began broadcasting (which was ceased a few years later).

Italian-language television stations
Television channels and stations established in 1998
RAI television channels
Educational and instructional television channels
Distance education institutions based in Italy